Rowing at the 2010 Asian Para Games was held in International Rowing Centre, Guangzhou, China from December 13 to 14, 2010.

Medal summary

Medal table
Retrieved from Asian Para Games 2010 Official Website.

Medalists

Results

Men's single sculls

Heat
December 13

Final
December 14

Women's single sculls

Heat
December 13

Final
December 14

Mixed double sculls

Heat
December 13

Final
December 14

Mixed coxed four

Heat
December 13

Final
December 14

References

2010 Asian Para Games events
Asian Para Games
2010 Asian Para Games